Siniša Sesar (born 14 October 1972) is a Croatian footballer and later football manager.

References

1972 births
Living people
Sportspeople from Vinkovci
Association football defenders
Croatian footballers
HNK Cibalia players
HNK Vukovar '91 players
GNK Dinamo Zagreb players
NK Marsonia players
NK Međimurje players
Croatian Football League players
Croatian football managers
HNK Cibalia managers
Croatian Football League managers